The Pale Haunt Departure is the fifth full-length album by the American death-doom band Novembers Doom, released in 2005. On this album the band shifted styles towards a more straightforward death metal sound with a gothic metal influence. Two music videos were made for this album. One for "The Pale Haunt Departure" and the other for "Autumn Reflection."

Track listing

Personnel
 Paul Kuhr - vocals
 Joe Nunez - drums
 Mike Legros - bass
 Vito Marchese - guitars
 Larry Roberts - guitars, keyboards

Additional personnel and staff
 Tommy Crucianelli - keyboards
 Eric Burnley - keyboards
 Dan Swanö - lead guitar on "Dark World Burden", mixing
 Attila Kis - design, illustration
 James Murphy - mastering
 Chris Wisco - producer, engineering, editing
 Mark Coatsworth - photography

References

2005 albums
Novembers Doom albums
The End Records albums